Werai was a railway station on the Main South railway line in New South Wales, Australia. It served the small Southern Highlands town of Werai. A station opened in the locality in 1883 as Meryla, this station was moved in 1897 and renamed Werai in 1901. Consisting of a pair of side platforms, it closed in 1969 and has been demolished, little trace now remains.

References

Disused regional railway stations in New South Wales
Railway stations in Australia opened in 1883
Railway stations closed in 1969
Main Southern railway line, New South Wales
Southern Highlands (New South Wales)